Igor A. Kaltashov, Ph.D., is an American chemist, who is active in the fields of mass spectrometry and biochemistry; he is an associate professor of the University of Massachusetts Amherst (UMass).

Works 
 Igor A. Kaltashov, Eyles S. J. Mass spectrometry in structural biology and biophysics : architecture, dynamics, and interaction of biomolecules. — 2nd ed. — Hoboken, NJ: Wiley, 2012. — 289 p. — . — . — . — . — .

Awards 
 Research Award - American Society for Mass Spectrometry (ASMS); Thermo Fisher Scientific, Waters Corporation (2000).

References

Literature 
 Rachel Brazil: Mass Spectrometry in Biopharmaceutical Discovery // Technology Networks, May 29, 2018.

Web-sources 
 
 
 

Living people
Year of birth missing (living people)
21st-century American chemists
University of Massachusetts Amherst faculty